Bagaliy Dabo (born 27 July 1988) is a French professional footballer who plays as a forward for Apollon Limassol in the Cypriot First Division.

Club career
Dabo made his professional debut with FC Istres in August 2014, in a 4–2 Ligue 2 defeat against Angers.

On 29 June 2016, Dabo signed a two-year contract with Azerbaijan Premier League side Gabala FK. On 17 June 2018, Dabo signed a two-year contract with fellow Azerbaijan Premier League club Neftçi PFK.

On 3 July 2020, Apollon Limassol announced the signing of Dabo on a two-year contract.

Personal life
Born in France, Dabo is of Senegalese descent.

Career statistics

Club

Honours

Individual
Azerbaijan Premier League Top Scorer (2): 2017–18, 2019–20

References

External links

Bagaliy Dabo foot-national.com Profile

1988 births
Living people
Association football forwards
French footballers
French sportspeople of Senegalese descent
Expatriate footballers in Azerbaijan
Ligue 2 players
Championnat National players
Azerbaijan Premier League players
US Ivry players
US Créteil-Lusitanos players
FC Istres players
Gabala FC players
Neftçi PFK players
French expatriate sportspeople in Azerbaijan